Stephen Laurence is a scientist and philosopher, currently at the University of Sheffield, whose primary areas of research interest are the philosophy of mind, the philosophy of language, and cognitive science.

He is Director of the Innateness and the Structure of the Mind Project, an interdisciplinary inquiry into nativist theorizing funded by the Arts & Humanities Research Council.

He is also co-director of the Hang Seng Centre for Cognitive Studies.

See also 
 Interdisciplinarity
 Nativist theorizing

External links

20th-century British philosophers
21st-century British philosophers
Academics of the University of Sheffield
Analytic philosophers
British consciousness researchers and theorists
Philosophers of language
Philosophers of mind
Year of birth missing (living people)
Living people